The Alan Parsons Project was a British rock band active between 1975 and 1990, whose core membership consisted of producer, audio engineer, musician and composer Alan Parsons and singer, songwriter and pianist Eric Woolfson. They were accompanied by varying session musicians and some relatively consistent session players such as guitarist Ian Bairnson, arranger Andrew Powell, bassist and vocalist David Paton, drummer Stuart Elliott, and vocalists Lenny Zakatek and Chris Rainbow. Parsons and Woolfson shared writing credits on almost all of the Project's songs, with Parsons producing or co-producing all of the band's recordings.

The Alan Parsons Project released eleven studio albums in its 15-year career, the most successful being I Robot (1977) and Eye in the Sky (1982). Many of their albums are conceptual in nature and focus on science fiction, supernatural, literary and sociological themes. Among the group's most popular songs are "I Wouldn't Want to Be Like You", "Games People Play", "Time", "Sirius"/"Eye in the Sky" and "Don't Answer Me".

Career

1974–1976: Formation and debut 
Alan Parsons met Eric Woolfson in the canteen of Abbey Road Studios in the summer of 1974. Parsons acted as Assistant Engineer on the Beatles' albums Abbey Road (1969) and Let It Be (1970), engineered Pink Floyd's The Dark Side of the Moon (1973), and produced several acts for EMI Records. Woolfson, a songwriter and composer, was working as a session pianist while composing material for a concept album based on the work of Edgar Allan Poe.

Woolfson's idea was to manage Alan and help his already successful production career.  This was the start of their longstanding friendly business relationship. He managed Parsons' career as a producer and engineer through a string of successes, including Pilot, Steve Harley, Cockney Rebel, John Miles, Al Stewart, Ambrosia, and the Hollies. Woolfson came up with the idea of making an album based on developments in the film industry—the focal point of the films' promotion shifted from film stars to directors such as Alfred Hitchcock and Stanley Kubrick. If the film industry was becoming a director's medium, Woolfson felt the music business might well become a producer's medium.

Recalling his earlier Edgar Allan Poe material, Woolfson saw a way to combine his and Parsons's talents. Parsons produced and engineered songs written and composed by the two, and the first Alan Parsons Project was begun. The Project's first album, Tales of Mystery and Imagination (1976), released by 20th Century Fox Records and including major contributions by all members of Pilot and Ambrosia, was a success, reaching the Top 40 in the US Billboard 200 chart. The song "The Raven" featured lead vocals by the actor Leonard Whiting. According to the 2007 re-mastered album liner notes, this was the first rock song to use a digital vocoder, with Alan Parsons speaking lyrics through it, although others such as Bruce Haack pioneered this field in the previous decade.

1977–1990: Mainstream success and final releases 

Arista Records then signed the Alan Parsons Project for further albums. Through the late 1970s and early 1980s, the Project's popularity continued to grow. However, the Project was always more popular in North America, Ibero-America, and Continental Europe than in Parsons' home country, never achieving a UK Top 40 single or Top 20 album. The singles "I Wouldn't Want to Be Like You", "Games People Play", "Damned If I Do", "Time" (the first single to feature Woolfson's lead vocal) and "Eye in the Sky" had a notable impact on the Billboard Hot 100. "Don't Answer Me" became the Project's last successful single in the United States; it reached the top 15 on the American charts in 1984. 
After those successes, however, the Project began to fade from view. There were fewer hit singles, and declining album sales. 1987's Gaudi would be the Project's final release, though it had planned to record an album called Freudiana (1990) next.

The musical Freudiana 
Even though the studio version of Freudiana was produced by Parsons (and featured the regular Project session musicians, making it an 'unofficial' Project album), it was primarily Woolfson's idea to turn it into a musical. While Parsons pursued his own solo career and took many session players of the Project on the road for the first time in a successful worldwide tour, Woolfson went on to produce musical plays influenced by the Project's music. Freudiana, Gaudi, and Gambler were three musicals that included some Project songs like "Eye in the Sky", "Time", "Inside Looking Out", and "Limelight". The live music from Gambler was only distributed at the performance site in Mönchengladbach, Germany.

The Sicilian Defence 
In 1979, Parsons, Woolfson, and their record label Arista, had been stalled in contract renegotiations when the two submitted an all-instrumental album tentatively titled The Sicilian Defence, named after an aggressive opening move in chess, arguably to get out of their recording contract. Arista's refusal to release the album had two known effects: the negotiations led to a renewed contract, and the album was not released at that time.

In interviews he gave before his death in 2009, Woolfson said he planned to release one track from the "Sicilian" album, which in 2008 appeared as a bonus track on a CD re-issue of the Eve album. Sometime later, after he had relocated the original tapes, Parsons reluctantly agreed to release the album and announced that it would finally be released on an upcoming Project box set called The Complete Albums Collection in 2014 for the first time as a bonus disc.

Parsons' and Woolfson's solo careers 
Parsons released titles under his name; these were Try Anything Once (1993), On Air (1996), The Time Machine (1999), A Valid Path (2004) and The Secret (2019). Meanwhile, Woolfson made concept albums titled Freudiana (1990), about Sigmund Freud's work on psychology, and Poe: More Tales of Mystery and Imagination (2003); this continued from the Alan Parsons Project's first album about Edgar Allan Poe's literature.

Tales of Mystery and Imagination (1976) was re-mixed in 1987 for release on CD, and included narration by Orson Welles recorded in 1975, but delivered too late to be included on the original album. For the 2007 deluxe edition release, parts of this tape were used for the 1976 Griffith Park Planetarium launch of the original album, the 1987 remix, and various radio spots. All were included as bonus material.

Sound 
The band's sound is described as progressive rock, art rock, progressive pop, and soft rock. "Sirius" is their best-known and most-frequently heard of all Parsons/Woolfson  songs. It was used as entrance music by various American sports teams, notably by the Chicago Bulls during their 1990s NBA dynasty. It was also used as the entrance theme for Ricky Steamboat in pro wrestling of the mid-1980s. In addition, "Sirius" is played in a variety of TV shows and movies including the BBC series Record Breakers, the episode "Vanishing Act" of The Adventures of Jimmy Neutron: Boy Genius and the 2009 film Cloudy with a Chance of Meatballs.

Vocal duties were shared by guests to complement each song. In later years, Woolfson sang lead on many of the group's hits, including "Time", "Eye in the Sky", and "Don't Answer Me". The record company pressured Parsons to use Woolfson more, but Parsons preferred to use polished proficient singers; Woolfson admitted he was not in that category. In addition to Woolfson, vocalists Chris Rainbow, Lenny Zakatek, John Miles, David Paton, and Colin Blunstone are regulars. Other singers, such as Arthur Brown, Steve Harley, Gary Brooker, Dave Terry a.k.a. Elmer Gantry, Vitamin Z's Geoff Barradale, and Marmalade's Dean Ford, recorded only once or twice with the Project. Parsons sang lead on one song ("The Raven") through a vocoder and backing on a few others, including "To One in Paradise". Both of those songs appeared on Tales of Mystery and Imagination (1976). Parsons also sings a prominent counter melody on “Time”.

A variety of session musicians worked with the Alan Parsons Project regularly,  contributing to the recognizable style of a song despite the varied singer line-up. With Parsons and Woolfson, the studio band consisted of the group Pilot, with Ian Bairnson (guitar), David Paton (bass) and Stuart Tosh (drums). Pilot's keyboardist Billy Lyall contributed. From Pyramid (1978) onward, Tosh was replaced by Stuart Elliott of Cockney Rebel. Bairnson played on all albums, and Paton stayed almost until the end. Andrew Powell appeared as arranger of orchestra (and often choirs) on all albums except Vulture Culture (1985); he was composing the score of Richard Donner's film Ladyhawke (1985). This score was partly in the APP style, recorded by most of the APP regulars, and produced and engineered by Parsons. Powell composed some material for the first two Project albums. For Vulture Culture and later, Richard Cottle played as a regular contributor on synthesizers and saxophone.

The Alan Parsons Project played live only once under that name during its original incarnation because Woolfson and Parsons held the roles of writing and production, and because of the technical difficulties of re-producing on stage the complex instrumentation used in the studio. In the 1990s, musical production evolved with the technology of digital samplers. The one occasion the band was introduced as 'The Alan Parsons Project' in a live performance was at The Night of the Proms in October 1990. The concerts featured all Project regulars except Woolfson, present behind the scenes, while Parsons stayed at the mixer except for the last song, when he played acoustic guitar.

Since 1993, Alan Parsons continues to perform live as the Alan Parsons Live Project to be distinct from The Alan Parsons Project. The current line up consists of lead singer P.J. Olsson, guitarist Jeffrey Kollman, drummer Danny Thompson, keyboardist Tom Brooks, bass guitarist Guy Erez, vocalist and saxophonist Todd Cooper, and guitarist and vocalist Dan Tracey. In 2013, Alan Parsons Live Project played Colombia with a full choir and orchestra (the Medellin Philharmonic) as 'Alan Parsons Symphonic Project'. A 2-CD live set and a DVD version of this concert were released in May 2016.

Members 
Official members
 Alan Parsons – production, engineering, programming, composition, vocals, keyboards, guitars (1975–1990)
 Eric Woolfson – composition, lyrics, piano, keyboards, vocals, executive production (1975–1990)

Notable contributors
 Andrew Powell – composition, keyboards, orchestral arrangements (1975–1996)
 Philharmonia Orchestra
 Ian Bairnson – guitars (1975–1990)
 David Pack – guitars (1976, 1993), vocals, keyboards (1993)
 Richard Cottle – keyboards, saxophone (1984–1990)
 David Paton – bass, vocals (1975–1986)
 Stuart Tosh – drums, percussion (1975–1977)
 Stuart Elliott – drums, percussion (1977–1990)
 Geoff Barradale – vocals (1987)
 Phil Kenzie – saxophone (1978)
 Dennis Clarke – saxophone (1980)
 Colin Blunstone – vocals (1978–1984)
 Gary Brooker – vocals (1985)
 Arthur Brown – vocals (1975)
 Lesley Duncan – vocals (1979)
 Graham Dye – vocals (1985, 1998)
 Dean Ford – vocals (1978)
 Dave Terry ("Elmer Gantry") – vocals (1980, 1982)
 Jack Harris – vocals (1976–1978)
 The Hollies – vocals
 John Miles – vocals (1976, 1978, 1985, 1987, 1990)
 Chris Rainbow – vocals (1979–1990)
 Eric Stewart – vocals (1990, 1993)
 Peter Straker – vocals (1977)
 Clare Torry – vocals (1979)
 Dave Townsend – vocals (1977, 1979)
 Lenny Zakatek – vocals (1977–1987)
 The English Chorale – choir (1976, 1977, 1982, 1987)

Discography 

 Tales of Mystery and Imagination (1976)
 I Robot (1977)
 Pyramid (1978)
 Eve (1979)
 The Turn of a Friendly Card (1980)
 Eye in the Sky (1982)
 Ammonia Avenue (1984)
 Vulture Culture (1985)
 Stereotomy (1985)
 Gaudi (1987)
 Freudiana (1990 – Austrian Original Cast Musical Soundtrack, virtually a solo Woolfson project)
 The Sicilian Defence (2014, recorded in 1979)

Related 
 The Philharmonia Orchestra Plays the Best of the Alan Parsons Project (1983 – orchestral album by Andrew Powell)
 Ladyhawke (1985 – soundtrack by Powell, produced and engineered by Parsons)

References

External links 

  www.The-Alan-Parsons-Project.com
 The official Eric Woolfson website
 
 The Alan Parsons Project albums to be listened as stream at Spotify.com

 
British progressive rock groups
British soft rock music groups
Arista Records artists
Charisma Records artists
Progressive pop musicians
Soft rock duos
Male musical duos